Becky Ngozi Okorie is a Nigerian actress. She is chiefly known as the titular character for the 1996 horror movie Karishika.

References

External links 

Living people
Year of birth missing (living people)
Nigerian film actresses
Igbo actresses
20th-century Nigerian actresses
21st-century Nigerian actresses